Pipizella maculipennis is a species of hoverfly, from the family Syrphidae, in the order Diptera.

References

Diptera of Europe
Pipizinae
Insects described in 1822
Taxa named by Johann Wilhelm Meigen